The Anglican Church of St Peter at Willersey in the Cotswold District of Gloucestershire, England was built in the 12th century. It is a grade I listed building. St Peter's has a fifteenth century bell tower with traditional pinnacles and gargoyles.

History

The church nave was built in the 12th century. In the 13th the aisle was rebuilt and a porch added. The tower was added in the 15th century.

In the 14th and 15th centuries the church was expanded by the Abbots of Evesham who had their summer residence in Willersey.

The six bells within the tower were cast in 1712 from three earlier bells by Rudhall of Gloucester.

A major refurbishment costing £100,000 was completed in 2017.

The parish of Willersey with Saintbury is part of the Vale and Cotswold Edge benefice within the Diocese of Gloucester.

Architecture

The limestone building consists of the nave, chancel, transept and two-stage tower.

The font is Norman, and a piscina from the 14th century.

References

Church of England church buildings in Gloucestershire
Grade I listed churches in Gloucestershire